Ásgeir Örn Hallgrimsson (born 17 February 1984) is an Icelandic  former handball player. After starting his career with Haukar, he went on to play several seasons professionally around Europe, including with GOG and TBV Lemgo. He announced his retirement following the 2019–2020 season.

Ásgeir played 247 games for the Icelandic national team, scoring 414 goals, and competed with the team at the 2004, 2008, and 2012 Summer Olympics.

References

External links 
 
 
 
 

1984 births
Living people
Asgeir Hallgrimsson
Asgeir Hallgrimsson
Asgeir Hallgrimsson
Olympic medalists in handball
Handball players at the 2004 Summer Olympics
Handball players at the 2008 Summer Olympics
Handball players at the 2012 Summer Olympics
Medalists at the 2008 Summer Olympics
Recipients of the Order of the Falcon
Asgeir Hallgrimsson
Handball-Bundesliga players
Expatriate handball players
Asgeir Hallgrimsson
Asgeir Hallgrimsson
Asgeir Hallgrimsson
Asgeir Hallgrimsson